Tommy Nilsson (born 10 March 1955) is a former speedway rider from Sweden.

Speedway career 
Nilsson is a former champion of Sweden, winning the Swedish Championship in 1983. He reached the final of the Speedway World Team Cup in the 1977 Speedway World Team Cup.

He rode in the top tier of British Speedway from 1973 until 1977, riding for Hackney Hawks and Coventry Bees.

World Final Appearances

Individual World Championship
 1977 -  Göteborg, Ullevi - 10th - 6pts

World Team Cup
 1977 -  Wrocław, Olympic Stadium (with Bengt Jansson / Anders Michanek / Sören Karlsson / Bernt Persson) - 4th - 11pts (0)

References 

1955 births
Living people
Swedish speedway riders
Coventry Bees riders
Hackney Hawks riders
Sportspeople from Uppsala